National Route 169 is a national highway of Japan connecting Nara, Nara and Shingū, Wakayama in Japan, with a total length of 184.6 km (114.71 mi).

History
National Route 169 was originally designated on 18 May 1953 as a second-class national highway connecting the now dissolved town, Kinomoto, in Mie Prefecture to Yamatotakada, Nara.

See also

References

External links

National highways in Japan
Roads in Mie Prefecture
Roads in Nara Prefecture
Roads in Wakayama Prefecture